The Play-offs of the 2011 Fed Cup Europe/Africa Zone Group II were the final stages of the Group II Zonal Competition involving teams from Europe and Africa. Using the positions determined in their pools, the seven teams faced off to determine their placing in the 2011 Fed Cup Europe/Africa Zone Group II. The top two teams advanced to Group I, and the bottom two teams were relegated down to the Group III for the next year.

Promotion play-offs
The first placed teams of each pool played against the second-placed teams of the other pool in head-to-head rounds. The winner of each round advanced to the 2012 Europe/Africa Zone Group I.

Portugal vs. Georgia

Bosnia and Herzegovina vs. Finland

Relegation play-offs
The third placed teams of each pool were drawn in head-to-head rounds. The loser was relegated down to Europe/Africa Zone Group III in 2012.

Morocco vs. Turkey

  came last out of Pool B, but could not be drawn against anyone due to the odd number of teams in Pool A. As such, Armenia was automatically relegated down to Europe/Africa Zone Group III for 2012.

Final Placements

  and  advanced to the Europe/Africa Zone Group I for the next year. The Portuguese placed fifth overall, while the Bosnians and Herzegovinians placed eleventh.

See also
Fed Cup structure

References

External links
 Fed Cup website

2011 Fed Cup Europe/Africa Zone